Dominika Paleta (born Dominika Paleta Paciorek October 23, 1972 in Kraków, Poland) is a Polish-Mexican actress.

Life and career

Paleta's career has included roles in several telenovelas, most notably La usurpadora (1998). Other productions in which the actress has participated include Por un beso (2000), La Intrusa (2001), El Alma Herida (2003), La noche de siempre (2005), Los Plateados (2005),  Trece miedos (2007), Mañana es para siempre (2008), Triunfo del Amor (2010) and Por Siempre mi Amor (2013).

Filmography

Films

Television

See also
 List of Polish people

References

External links

1972 births
Living people
Mexican telenovela actresses
Mexican television actresses
Mexican film actresses
Mexican stage actresses
Mexican voice actresses
20th-century Mexican actresses
21st-century Mexican actresses
Polish emigrants to Mexico
Naturalized citizens of Mexico